Saywan Barzani (Arabic: سيوان بارزانی) is an Iraqi diplomat. He currently is  the ambassador of Iraq to Italy.

Saywan Sabir Mustafa Barzani was born in Erbil, Kurdistan province of Iraq. He moved to Persia with his family when he was a child and lived there for around 7 years. He studied Law from the University of Orléans and also holds a master's degree and a PhD in political science from the University of Paris I Panthéon – Sorbonne.   

Mr Barzani was the Permanent Representative of the Republic of Iraq to the OPCW. The same year, he became the ambassador of Iraq to the Netherlands. Before that, he was the Iraqi ambassador to Italy.

References

External links
 Saywan Barzani Profile (Embassy of Iraq in The Hague)

Year of birth missing (living people)
Living people
Iraqi Kurdish people
Iraqi diplomats
Ambassadors of Iraq to Italy
Ambassadors of Iraq to the Netherlands